Sri Pavuluri Subbarao Public School is a private co-educational English school in Narasaraopet, Andhra Pradesh. It was founded in 1987, and is affiliated to the CBSE and the Andhra Pradesh Board of Secondary Education.

Academics 
The trilingual method is followed with English as the medium of instruction and English/Telugu/Hindi as language options.

Schools in Guntur district
1987 establishments in Andhra Pradesh
Educational institutions established in 1987